Carl Edvard Alfonso Paulsen (July 31, 1896 – November 11, 1973) was a Norwegian sculptor.

Education
Paulsen received his education as a sculptor at the Norwegian National Academy of Craft and Art Industry and with the Danish sculptor Rudolph Tegner in Copenhagen. He then studied with the French sculptor Antoine Bourdelle. He also made a number of study trips, including to Belgium, England, France, Italy, and the Netherlands, which influenced his work.

Career
In Tønsberg, Paulsen is best known for his enthusiasm for the town. This was particularly evident after he became chairman of the Castle Hill Committee (Slottsfjellkomiteen) a few years after the war. As a guide to the town, he portrayed the old Tønsberg, and he was particularly interested in Princess Christina. He portrayed her life so that the audience gained an impression of her time through his descriptions of scenes, clothing, and individuals.

Paulsen was honored with the King's Medal of Merit in 1969. In 1967 the Tønsberg Marketing Association (Tønsberg Markedsforening) selected him for its first Red Rose (Røde rose) award, which is given to individuals, companies, or institutions that have shown ingenuity and initiative in fields that fall under the concept of marketing. When Paulsen died in 1973, he was an honorary pensioner of Tønsberg. Carl E. Paulsen Square (Carl E. Paulsens plass), which is behind today's Farmandstredet shopping center, the former Kremmer House (Kremmerhuset), is named after him.

Works

Tønsberg
There are 13 works by Paulsen in Tønsberg:
 Memorial to the merchant Carl Stoltenberg in Stoltenberg Park (Stoltenberg-parken), 1926
 Roald Amundsen-monumentet (Roald Amundsen Monument), 1933
 Bust of the shipping magnate Wilhelm Wilhelmsen at the Gunnarsbø mansion, 1940
 Vækteren (The Watchman) in front of the former Vinmonopolet outlet on Main Street (Storgaten), 1950
 Bust of Prime Minister Abraham Berge on Seafront Promenade (Strandpromenaden), 1951
 Bust of Major Carsten Bruun on Priest Street (Prestegaten), 1956
 Bust of the shipowner Halfdan Wilhelmsen across from the Roald Amundsen Monument, 1961
 Førstereisgutten (The Boy's First Journey At Sea) at the Channel Bridge (Kanalbroen), 1963
 Pingvinene (The Penguins) on Walking Street (Gågaten), 1967
 Monument to the painter Mathias Stoltenberg in Stoltenberg Park, 1971
 Bust of King Haakon VII at the county museum, 1972
 Bust of the sea captain Christian Nielsen Stranger at the Haugar farm, undated

Nøtterøy
 Bust of the captain and tanker ship inventor Even Tollefsen in the Teie neighborhood on Nøtterøy, 1941
 War memorial in the park by Nøtterøy Church
 Relief in the Nøtterøy Church porch

Horten
 Oscar Wisting monument, 1938
 Leif Welding-Olsen, statue, bronze, 1950
 Fountain (figures) in bronze and granite in the square in Horten, 1954

Other locations
 Cort Adeler monument in Brevik, 1922
 Bust of Lorens Berg at Kodal Church, 1928
 Roald Amundsen monument at Prostneset in Tromsø, 1936
 Statue of Otto Sverdrup in Steinkjer, 1957
 Bust of King Haakon VII at Gamlehaugen in Bergen
 King's bust in King Haakon's Church in Copenhagen
 Relief av King Olav V the Norwegian Seamen's Church in Gothenburg
 Monument to Captain Magnus Andersen in Lincoln Park, Chicago
 Bust of the administrative officer Anders Arnoldsøn Rørholt outside the power station at Hvittingfoss

References

1896 births
1973 deaths
20th-century Norwegian sculptors
Recipients of the King's Medal of Merit in gold
People from Tønsberg